Sesvete is the easternmost city district of Zagreb, Croatia. With a total population of 70,009 (as of 2011) it is the most populated district as well as the largest by area (165.255 km2). The settlement population is 54,085.

Administrative division
The Sesvete district includes the following local government units - local committees, some of which are also individual settlements:

Adamovec
Belovar
Blaguša
Budenec
Cerje
Dobrodol
Dumovec
Đurđekovec
Gajec
Gajišće
Glavničica
Glavnica Donja
Glavnica Gornja
Goranec
Jelkovec
Jesenovec
Kašina
Kašinska Sopnica
Kobiljak
Kraljevečki Novaki
Kučilovina
 Luka
Lužan
Moravče
Novo Brestje
Paruževina
Planina Donja
Glanina Gornja
Popovec
Prekvršje
Prepuštovec
Sesvete
Sesvetska Sela
Sesvetska Selnica
Sesvetska Sopnica
Sesvetski Kraljevec
Soblinec
Staro Brestje
Šašinovec
Šimunčevec
Vugrovec Donji
Vugrovec Gornji
Vurnovec
Žerjavinec

References

External links

 Sesvete Official Web Site
 Sesvete danas, and e-zine from Sesvete
 Sesvete Wireless
 Unofficial web site of Sesvete

Districts of Zagreb
Populated places in the City of Zagreb